Thelma is an unincorporated community in Bexar County, in the U.S. state of Texas. According to the Handbook of Texas, the community had a population of 45 in 2000. It is located within the Greater San Antonio metropolitan area.

History
The area in what is known as Thelma today was first settled sometime before 1900. A post office was established at Thelma in 1906 and remained in operation until 1921 when it received general delivery. The community became a station on the San Antonio, Uvalde and Gulf Railroad in 1912. Two years later, the community added four dairies and a general store serving 300 residents. It still had one business and 25 residents in 1940. It declined after World War II and had several scattered homes in 1990. Its population was 45 in 2000.

Geography

Education
Thelma is served by the Southside Independent School District.

References

Unincorporated communities in Bexar County, Texas
Unincorporated communities in Texas
Greater San Antonio